Jennie Gaby Christel Nilsson (born 25 January 1972) is a Swedish politician of the Social Democrats. She served as Minister for Rural Affairs in the Löfven cabinet from January 2019 to June 2021 and has been Member of the Riksdag since October 2006, representing her home constituency Halland County.

Before being elected to the Riksdag in 2006, Nilsson served as Mayor of Hylte Municipality from 2001 to 2006.

External links
Jennie Nilsson at the Riksdag website

Members of the Riksdag from the Social Democrats
Living people
1972 births
Women members of the Riksdag
21st-century Swedish women politicians
Women government ministers of Sweden
Members of the Riksdag 2006–2010
Members of the Riksdag 2010–2014
Members of the Riksdag 2014–2018
Members of the Riksdag 2018–2022
Members of the Riksdag 2022–2026
People from Halland County